Glenea iphia is a species of beetle in the family Cerambycidae. It was described by Francis Polkinghorne Pascoe in 1867. It is known from Sulawesi.

Varietas
 Glenea iphia var. celebiana Breuning, 1960
 Glenea iphia var. inframetallica Breuning, 1958

References

iphia
Beetles described in 1867